Colette the Unwanted (French: Les larmes de Colette) is a 1927 French silent film directed by René Barberis.

Cast
 André Rolane  as Colette 
 Marcelle Barry as L'institutrice  
 Renée Carl as Madame Lapierre  
 Olga Day as Madame Duboin-Larbeuil  
 Gisele Joly as Simone  
 Paul Jorge as Le grand-père  
 Louisette Malapert as Giselle Lapierre  
 Daniel Mendaille as Le père Duboin-Larbeuil  
 Sandra Milovanoff as Marie  
 Georges Saillard as Le notaire

References

Bibliography 
 Philippe Rège. Encyclopedia of French Film Directors, Volume 1. Scarecrow Press, 2009.

External links 
 

1927 films
French silent films
1920s French-language films
Films directed by René Barberis
Pathé films
French black-and-white films
1920s French films